Quintus Volusius Saturninus (born AD 25) was a Roman Senator who lived in the Roman Empire during the Principate. He was consul in the year 56 with Publius Cornelius Scipio as his colleague.

Family background
The Volusii, according to Tacitus, were an ancient and distinguished Senatorial family who never rose above the praetorship until Saturninus' grandfather, Lucius Volusius Saturninus, achieved that distinction. Saturninus' father, also named Lucius Volusius Saturninus, not only acceded to that office, but received a state funeral under the Emperor Nero and Cornelia Lentula. Saturninus is known to have an elder brother, Lucius Volusius Saturninus, and a sister, Volusia Cornelia.

Political career
Surviving inscriptions indicate that a burial club of his slaves and freedmen operated a columbarium on the Appian Way. Tacitus describes Saturninus as a man of aristocratic status.

The political career of Saturninus is only known from the point he achieved the consulate. In 61–63, he carried out a census in Gaul, together with Titus Sextius Africanus and Marcus Trebellius Maximus. Saturninus and Africanus were rivals; however, they both hated Maximus, who took advantage of their rivalry to get the better of them. Based on inscriptions, the Horrea Volusiana was either built by his paternal grandfather Lucius Volusius Saturninus, suffect consul of 12 BC, or Saturninus himself.

An inscription attests that Saturninus was also a member of several Roman priesthoods. These were the sodales Augustales, the sodales Titii, and the enigmatic Arval Brethren. Another inscription attests to Saturninus' presence at their ceremonies in the year 63.

Family and issue
Saturninus married a woman called Torquata; her name is known to us from the tombstone of one of her slaves. Torquata bore Saturninus the following children:
 Son, Lucius Volusius Saturninus, consul in 87
 Daughter, Volusia Torquata; she is thought to have married a Marcus Licinius whose name is inferred from their surmised granddaughter Licinia Cornelia M.f. Volusia Torquata.
 Son, Quintus Volusius Saturninus, consul in 92

References

Sources
Tacitus - The Annals of Imperial Rome
G. Rickman, Roman Granaries and Store Buildings, CUP Archive, 1971
Susan Treggiari, "Family Life among the Staff of the Volusii", Transactions of the American Philological Association, 105 (1974-1975)

 
 

1st-century Romans
Imperial Roman consuls
Senators of the Roman Empire
Saturninus, Quintus
25 births
Year of death unknown